Shorea domatiosa is a species of tree in the family Dipterocarpaceae.   It is endemic to Borneo. It is an Endangered species threatened by habitat loss.

See also
List of Shorea species

References

domatiosa
Endemic flora of Borneo
Trees of Borneo
Taxonomy articles created by Polbot